Phaloe vogli is a moth in the subfamily Arctiinae. It was described by Franz Daniel in 1966. It is found in Venezuela.

References

Moths described in 1966
Arctiinae